Cléo from 5 to 7 is a 1962 French New Wave film written and directed by Agnès Varda.

The film follows a young singer, Florence "Cléo" Victoire, from 5 p.m. on June 21, until 6:30 p.m. as she waits to hear the results of a medical test that will possibly confirm a diagnosis of cancer. The film handles several themes such as existentialism, including discussions of mortality and despair. The film has a feminine viewpoint and raises questions about how women are perceived, especially in French society.

The film includes cameos by Jean-Luc Godard, Anna Karina, Eddie Constantine and Jean-Claude Brialy as characters in the silent film Raoul shows Cléo and Dorothée, while composer Michel Legrand, who wrote the film's score, plays "Bob the pianist". It was entered into the 1962 Cannes Film Festival.

Plot
Singer Cléo Victoire is having a tarot card reading with a fortune teller, who tells her there is an evil force in Cléo's life, and that she sees a doctor with a hazardous task. She also sees a meeting with a talkative young man in her future. The fortune teller then pulls the hanged man card, meaning that a change to the worse in Cléo's life is about to happen, and asks if she is ill, which Cléo affirms. She then proceeds to pull the death card. Although the fortune teller emphasises that the death card can also simply mean a profound change in the person's life, Cléo believes that she is doomed. She asks the fortune teller to read her palm, who rejects her request.

While distraught from her visit to the fortune teller, Cléo meets her maid, Angèle, at a café and recounts the results of the tarot card reading, claiming that if it's cancer, she'll kill herself. Cléo cries and the owner of the café gives her coffee to calm down. Cléo and Angèle proceed to go hat shopping, where Cléo buys a black fur hat, despite Angèle constantly reminding her that it's summertime. Cléo wants to wear the hat home, but Angèle reminds her that it's Tuesday, and it's bad luck to wear something new on a Tuesday. They have the shopkeeper send the hat to Cléo's home, and Cléo and Angèle take a taxi home in time for Cléo's rehearsal.

On the ride home, one of Cléo's songs plays, and they listen to the radio, hearing current news coverage including the Algerian War. They have a conversation with the female taxi driver as she muses about the dangers of her job. Towards the end of the taxi ride, Cléo grows nauseous and attributes it to her illness. Upon returning home, Cléo cannot breathe, and Angèle tells her to do some exercise. Before Cléo's lover, the man whom the fortune teller mentioned earlier, enters the building, Angèle tells Cléo not to tell him that she's ill, because "men hate illness". Her lover, a very busy man, tells her that he only has time to stop by for a kiss and can't even go on a vacation with her, but will try to take her out on Friday. Asking Cléo if she is ill, she replies that she is, but he doesn't take her seriously.

Once Cléo's lover leaves, Bob, a pianist, and Maurice, a writer, arrive at her home for her rehearsal. Bob and Maurice perform a spontaneous comedy routine pretending to be doctors once Angèle tells them that Cléo is ill, because "all women like a good joke." However, Cléo does not find their joke funny. Bob goes to the piano, and they begin to practice some of Cléo's songs. As they practice, Cléo's mood quickly darkens after singing the song "Sans toi." Cléo feels like all people do is exploit her and that it won't be long until she's just a puppet for the music industry. Saying that everyone spoils her but no one loves her, Cléo leaves everyone behind in her home.

On the way to a café, Cléo passes a street performer swallowing frogs and spitting them back out on a huge wave of water. She plays one of her songs at a jukebox in the café and watches if the people around react to it, but no one does. She then goes to a sculpting studio to visit her old friend Dorothée, who is modelling nude for a class of sculptors. After the modelling session is over, Cléo tells Dorothée that she couldn't pose nude because she would feel exposed, while Dorothée claims that her body makes her happy, not proud. Dorothée picks up a package for her friend Raoul who lent her his car to take it to the cinema where he's working. On the way, Cléo tells Dorothée that she is waiting for a test result and afraid of being terminally ill. At the cinema, they watch a silent comedy film from the projection booth, starring Jean-Luc Godard and Anna Karina. In the film, Karina topples over a hose pipe and dies, leaving behind a grieving Godard, but after he takes off his sunglasses, realising that it was only his dark glasses which made the events appear so gloomily, the scene repeats in a much lighter tone. Leaving the cinema, Cléo accidentally breaks a mirror, which she claims is a bad omen. Together with Dorothée she passes the café that she visited earlier, learning that a man was killed there. They enter a taxi, and Dorothée tells her that the broken mirror was meant for that man, not Cléo.

After having dropped Dorothée off, Cléo has the taxi driver take her to Parc Montsouris. In the park, Antoine, a soldier on leave from the Algerian War, addresses Cléo and tells her that today is the longest day of the year. During their conversation, Cléo tells him that her real name is Florence, and that she's afraid of her illness, while the sensitive Antoine reflects on the war, where people die for nothing, and that this scares him. He asks her to accompany him to the train station to return to the war if he accompanies her to the hospital to get her test results. At the hospital, the doctor whom Cléo had her appointment with for her results has already left. While sitting on a bench outside, the doctor rolls by in his car and tells Cléo that her condition is not too serious and that two months of radiotherapy will help her to get better. Cléo says that her fear seems to be gone, and she seems happy. Antoine says that he hates to leave, and that he would like to be with Cléo. She tells him that he is with her at this moment, and they smile at each other.

Cast
 Corinne Marchand as Florence "Cléo"
 José Luis de Vilallonga as José, Cléo's lover
 Loye Payen as Irma
 Dominique Davray as Angèle
 Serge Korber as Maurice
 Dorothée Blanck as Dorothée
 Raymond Cauchetier as Raoul
 Michel Legrand as Bob
 Antoine Bourseiller as Antoine
 Robert Postec as Doctor Valineau
 Jean Champion as the café owner
 Jean-Pierre Taste as the waiter at the café
 Renée Duchateau as the seller of hats
 Lucienne Marchand as the taxi driver

Critical reception
Cléo from 5 to 7 first appeared on Sight & Sound magazine's Critic's Poll of the great movies of all time in 2002, appearing in 289th place. It rose to number 207 in the 2012 Critic's Poll, and in the 2022 poll reached number 14. It's the third-highest ranking for a film directed by a woman, after Claire Denis's Beau Travail at number 2 and Jeanne Dielman, 23, quai du Commerce, 1080 Bruxelles by Chantal Akerman at number 1. 

In 2019, Cléo from 5 to 7 was voted the second greatest film directed by a woman in a poll held by the BBC, polling 368 film experts from 84 countries.

On Rotten Tomatoes, the film has an approval rating of 92%, based on 50 reviews, with an average rating of 8.6/10. The website's critical consensus reads "Cléo from 5 to 7 represents a beautifully filmed highlight of the French New Wave that encapsulates the appeal of the era while departing from its narrative conventions."

References

Further reading

External links
 
 
 
 Cléo from 5 to 7 an essay by Molly Haskell at the Criterion Collection

1962 films
1962 drama films
French drama films
1960s French-language films
Italian drama films
Films directed by Agnès Varda
Films partially in color
Films produced by Carlo Ponti
Films scored by Michel Legrand
1960s Italian films
1960s French films